Baldwin Molina Domingo (December 8, 1926 – May 4, 2020) was an American politician and educator.

Domingo was born in Hamakuapoko, Maui County, Hawaii, to Braulio and Regina Domingo, and graduated from Maui High School. Domingo served in the United States Air Force and was commissioned a major. He received his bachelor's degrees from the University of the Philippines and Ohio State University. Domingo also received his master's degree from University of New Hampshire. He lived in Dover, New Hampshire, and taught military aviation history at Nathaniel Hawthorne College. Domingo served in the New Hampshire House of Representatives from 1998 to 2000 and again from 2004 to 2012 as a Democrat. Domingo died on 4 May 2020, in Wakefield, Massachusetts.

References

1926 births
2020 deaths
People from Maui County, Hawaii
People from Dover, New Hampshire
Military personnel from Hawaii
University of the Philippines alumni
Ohio State University alumni
University of New Hampshire alumni
Educators from New Hampshire
Democratic Party members of the New Hampshire House of Representatives
American expatriates in the Philippines